is a railway station formerly located in Chiebun (智恵文), Nayoro Hokkaidō, Japan, and was operated by the Hokkaido Railway Company.

Station information
During operation, this station served the Sōya Main Line.

This station is no longer in service and has been removed.

Adjacent stations

Railway stations in Hokkaido Prefecture
Defunct railway stations in Japan
Railway stations in Japan opened in 1924
Railway stations closed in 2006